Hell's Kitchen is an Italian reality television cooking competition (based on the British series of the same name) and American version broadcast on Fox. The Italian format is broadcast on Sky Uno since 2014. It is hosted by celebrity chef Carlo Cracco.

Format
The Italian format reflects the U.S. version. Two teams of aspiring chefs, equally divided between men and women, challenge tests with cooking and table service at the restaurant Hell's Kitchen, supervised and judged by chef Carlo Cracco. There may be as many as 16 chefs in the first and second edition. A key feature of the program is the psychological pressure to which chef Cracco submits competitors; in fact, he does not hesitate to turn to them using particularly offensive insults and epithets, to criticize or scold them, get them to work more efficiently, or even to drive them out of the kitchen.

Each season opens with competitors, always divided between men and women, presenting to a dish to chef Cracco, in an attempt to showcase their talents. Starting next episode, the first part of each episode consists of a challenge between the two teams (when there are fewer competitors, these challenges become individual.) In the final stage the colors of the two jackets disappear, to make room for the coveted black jackets. Whoever wins these challenges (which can also occur externally) is rewarded with a particularly entertaining or relaxing excursion. The losers, however, remain at Hell's Kitchen, or in a place outside, to serve a punishment consisting of very tiring, and, in some cases, humiliating, labor. The result of these tests, however, has no influence on what will be the final judgment of the episode.

In the second part of the episode, the contestants have to cook the dishes for restaurant customers (about 70), half of which are served by the blue team and the other half by the red, and Cracco with his sous chefs will check their quality. Based on the work done, Cracco decides which of the two teams was the worst, or both teams might be losers. Among either or both teams, Cracco will choose a chef who stood out positively over the others; they will be requested to nominate two teammates, including themselves. Cracco will choose who will be eliminated from the game. However, it is also possible that Cracco decides not to take these into account at time of nomination; he may eliminate competitors who have not been appointed, even those who belonged to the winning team, by virtue of their poor performance or inappropriate behavior. Similarly, competitors may be directly disposed of during the evening service, while in other cases no one is eliminated.

Starting in Season 4 in 2017, a new format was launched as follows: instead of rewards and punishments, the team that loses the challenge must undertake a separate task individually. Cracco will judge each team member's dish in order and anyone who beats a teammate is declared "safe". After all dishes have been judged, the worst performer is declared ineligible to participate in that evening's dinner service, effectively leaving their team short-handed. After dinner service, either or both losing teams must nominate their worst performers and Cracco will decide who was the worst of them all. This individual, as well as the loser of the individual challenge, face off against each other in a Cook For Your Life showdown, with the loser having to leave the competition altogether.

In fact, a difference of Hell's Kitchen from most reality show is that the contestants are not judged by an audience, a tele-voting, jury or other forms of score any decision about their continuation in the race; it is solely Cracco.

Chef Carlo Cracco runs the kitchen with the help of two sous-chefs: Omar Allievi and Entiana Osmenzeza in first edition, in second edition Misha Sukyas and Marion Lichtle, in third edition Sybil Cardone and Mirko Ronzoni, who coordinate the work of two teams of apprentices. Managing the relationship with customers is the maître'd Luca Cinacchi (his nickname is Luchino).

In the final episode the sous-chefs and the guest star (In the first edition Bruno Barbieri, in second edition Matteo Grandi, the winner of first edition) are tasked to sabotage the flow of the finalists, to test their awareness during the service.

Series overview

Season 1

Contestants

Contestant progress

 Color key
 Chef was eliminated after nomination
 Chef was eliminated after nomination by Cracco
 Chef was eliminated without nomination
 Chef was eliminated after a challenge, not after the service
 Chef wasn't in competition
 Chef was retained after nomination
 Chef was retained after nomination by Cracco
 Chef was the best of the worst/best
 The winner of Hell's Kitchen
 The runner-up of Hell's Kitchen

Season 2

Contestants

Contestant progress

 Color key
 Chef was eliminated after nomination
 Chef was eliminated after nomination by Cracco
 Chef was eliminated without nomination
 Chef was eliminated after a challenge, not after the service
 Chef was eliminated by Cracco during service
 Chef wasn't in competition
 Chef was retained after nomination
 Chef was retained after nomination by Cracco
 Chef voluntarily left the competition
 Chef was the best of the worst/best
 The winner of Hell's Kitchen
 The runner-up of Hell's Kitchen

Season 3

Contestants

Contestant progress

 Color key
 Chef was eliminated after nomination
 Chef was eliminated after nomination by Cracco
 Chef was eliminated without nomination
 Chef was eliminated after a challenge, not after the service
 Chef wasn't in competition
 Chef was retained after nomination
 Chef was retained after nomination by Cracco
 Chef was the best of the worst/best
 The winner of Hell's Kitchen
 The runner-up of Hell's Kitchen

Season 4

Contestants

Contestant progress

 Color key
 Chef was eliminated after nomination
 Chef was eliminated after nomination by Cracco
 Chef was eliminated without nomination
 Chef was eliminated after a challenge, not after the service
 Chef wasn't in competition
 Chef was retained after nomination
 Chef was retained after nomination by Cracco
 Chef was the best of the worst/best
 The winner of Hell's Kitchen
 The runner-up of Hell's Kitchen

Season 5

Contestants

Contestant progress

 Color key
 Chef was eliminated after nomination
 Chef was eliminated after nomination by Cracco
 Chef was eliminated without nomination
 Chef was eliminated after a challenge, not after the service
 Chef wasn't in competition
 Chef was retained after nomination
 Chef was retained after nomination by Cracco
 Chef was the best of the worst/best
 The winner of Hell's Kitchen
 The runner-up of Hell's Kitchen

References

Italian reality television series
Italian television series based on British television series
2014 Italian television series debuts
Italia
2010s Italian television series
Sky Uno original programming